The 2012 United States presidential election in North Carolina took place on November 6, 2012, as part of the 2012 General Election in which all 50 states plus the District of Columbia participated. North Carolina voters chose 15 electors to represent them in the Electoral College via a popular vote pitting incumbent Democratic President Barack Obama and his running mate, Vice President Joe Biden, against Republican challenger and former Massachusetts Governor Mitt Romney and his running mate, Congressman Paul Ryan.

Romney narrowly carried the state of North Carolina, winning 50.39% of the vote to Obama's 48.35%, a margin of 2.04%. North Carolina was one of just two states (along with Indiana) that flipped from voting for Obama in 2008 to voting Republican in 2012. Like Indiana, North Carolina had been a reliably Republican state prior to Obama's 2008 win, having not previously gone Democratic since 1976. Unlike Indiana, however, North Carolina was still considered a competitive swing state in 2012, and both campaigns targeted it heavily, with the Democrats holding their convention in Charlotte. Romney was the first presidential candidate since Zachary Taylor in 1848 to carry North Carolina while losing both Wake County and Mecklenburg County, the two most populous counties and home to the cities of Raleigh and Charlotte, respectively.  Romney also became the third ever Republican to carry North Carolina without winning the presidency after George H. W. Bush and Bob Dole in the 1992 and 1996 elections and Obama became the first ever Democrat incumbent win the state only once and then win re-election without it.  Although Obama lost North Carolina to Romney, he received more votes than he received in 2008, garnering 35,740 more. This is the first time Nash County had voted for a Democratic candidate since Jimmy Carter carried it in 1976. This is ironic considering the state otherwise flipped towards the Republican Party this election cycle, flipping four counties that were won by Obama four years prior.

As of 2020, this is the most recent election where the Republican presidential candidate won Watauga County; and where the Democratic presidential candidate won Bladen County, Gates County, Granville County, Martin County, Richmond County, and Robeson County. This is also the last time that any presidential candidate won the majority of the vote in North Carolina.

Primary elections

Democratic primary 
The 2012 North Carolina Democratic primary was held May 8, 2012. North Carolina awarded 157 delegates proportionally.

No candidate ran against incumbent President Barack Obama in North Carolina's Democratic presidential preference primary. Obama received 766,079 votes, or 79.23% of the vote, with the remainder (200,810 votes, or 20.77%) going to elect delegates with "No Preference".

At the North Carolina Democratic state convention, 152 delegates were awarded to Obama, with 5 delegates remaining unannounced.

Republican primary 

The 2012 North Carolina Republican primary was held May 8, 2012. North Carolina awarded 55 delegates proportionally. Ron Paul and Mitt Romney were the only active contenders on the ballot. By the time of the primary, Romney had already been declared the party's presumptive nominee.

Romney won the North Carolina GOP presidential primary with 65.62% of the vote. Paul (with 11.12% of the vote) narrowly edged out Santorum (with 10.39% of the vote), and Gingrich came in last with 7.64% of the vote. 5.23% of voters registered "no preference". The awarded delegate count from North Carolina's Republican state convention was Romney with 48 delegates and Paul with 7 delegates.

General election

Polling 

Statewide opinion polling for the 2012 United States presidential election

Throughout most of 2011, Obama won or tied with Romney in every poll. On September 25, 2011, Romney won a poll for the first time, 50% to 39%. Until May 2012, Obama had a consistent but narrow lead over Romney. Throughout the summer of 2012, the tide changed with Romney winning more polls than Obama. In September, Obama's momentum rose and Obama won most polls in September 2012. In October, the tide changed in Romney's favor, and Obama had not won a poll since October 1, 2012. Romney won every poll for the first three weeks in October, but then many polls came as tied between Obama and Romney. Romney led the last poll 50% to 46%, but the second last poll was tied. The last three polls showed an average of Romney leading 49% to 48%, which was accurate compared to the results.

Overview

By county

Counties that flipped from Democratic to Republican 

 Caswell (largest town: Yanceyville)
 Hyde (largest community: Ocracoke)
 Jackson (largest town: Cullowhee)
 Watauga (largest town: Boone)

Counties that flipped from Republican to Democratic 

 Nash (largest city: Rocky Mount)

By congressional district
Romney won 10 of the state's 13 congressional districts, including one held by a Democrat.

See also 
Republican Party presidential debates, 2012
Republican Party presidential primaries, 2012
 Results of the 2012 Republican Party presidential primaries
 North Carolina Republican Party

References

External links
North Carolina State Board of Elections
North Carolina Democratic Party
North Carolina Republican Party
The Green Papers: for North Carolina
The Green Papers: Major state elections in chronological order

United States president
North Carolina
2012